Zekirija Ramadani (born 21 January 1978) is a Macedonian professional football coach and former player of Albanian descent.

Club career

Ramadani started his career at FK Sloga Jugomagnat. In the summer of 2006, he went on loan to FK Rabotnički. He returned to Belasitsa Petrich in January 2007.

International career
He made his senior debut for Macedonia in a July 2000 friendly match against Azerbaijan and has earned a total of 7 caps, scoring no goals. His final international was a friendly against China in January 2004.

Player Achievements

KF Shkëndija
Macedonian Second League: 1995–96, 2009–10

KF Sloga Jugomagnat
Macedonian First League: 1999–2000, 2000–01
Macedonian Football Cup: 1999–2000, 2003–04

KF Bashkimi
Macedonian Football Cup: 2004–05

KF Vëllazërimi
Macedonian Second League: 2004–05

Qarabağ 
Azerbaijan Cup: 2008–09

Flamurtari
Kategoria Superiore runner-up: 2010–11

Coach Achievements

KF Shkupi
Macedonian Second League: 2014–15

KF Trepça
Football Superleague of Kosovo: 2016–17
Kosovar Supercup: 2017

FC Feronikeli
Football Superleague of Kosovo: 2018–19
Kosovar Cup: 2018–19
Kosovar Supercup: 2019

FC Prishtina
Football Superleague of Kosovo: 2020–21

References

External links

Profile at Qarabağ
Profile at Football Federation of Macedonia

1978 births
Living people
Footballers from Skopje
Albanians in North Macedonia
Association football midfielders
Macedonian footballers
North Macedonia international footballers
KF Shkëndija players
FK Sloga Jugomagnat players
FK Bashkimi players
FK Vëllazërimi 77 players
PFC Belasitsa Petrich players
FK Rabotnički players
Besa Kavajë players
Qarabağ FK players
FK Vardar players
Flamurtari Vlorë players
Macedonian First Football League players
First Professional Football League (Bulgaria) players
Kategoria Superiore players
Azerbaijan Premier League players
Macedonian expatriate footballers
Expatriate footballers in Bulgaria
Macedonian expatriate sportspeople in Bulgaria
Expatriate footballers in Albania
Macedonian expatriate sportspeople in Albania
Expatriate footballers in Azerbaijan
Macedonian expatriate sportspeople in Azerbaijan
Macedonian football managers
KF Shkupi managers
Flamurtari Vlorë managers
KF Trepça '89 managers
KF Feronikeli managers
Kategoria Superiore managers
Macedonian expatriate football managers
Expatriate football managers in Albania
Expatriate football managers in Kosovo
Macedonian expatriate sportspeople in Kosovo